"Sweet Dream" is a song by South Korean artists Kim Hee-chul and Min Kyung-hoon, the two stars who are known as Universe Cowards . Their stage name is a mix of Heechul's nickname "Universe Star" and Buzz's song "Coward".

Background and release 
"Sweet Dream" was released digitally by SM Entertainment on November 20, 2016. The song is a part of SM Station and is a collaboration single for the variety show Knowing Bros.

Reception 
The song proved successful, topping the South Korean Gaon Digital Chart, an achievement known as "all-kill".

Music video 
The music video portrays Kim as a high school student who has a crush on Momo Hirai but she only has eyes for his best friend, who is played by Min. The cast of Knowing Bros then come in and kidnap Momo, forcing Heechul and Kyung-hoon to learn martial arts from a master, who is played by Lee Soo-geun, and successfully defeat the gang members, with the help of Momo, who bashes the gang leaders head with a pot. When Kim rushes and hug Momo, Momo hug a puzzled Min instead, leaving Kim in distraught.  It is revealed that all the event is Kim own dream, as Momo appeared in Kim and Min classroom and introduces herself. At the end of the video, it is show that Min had been harboring feelings for Kim instead, evidenced by Min's writing on his table. The music video presents LGBT issues to viewers in a lighthearted manner.

Track listing

Charts and sales

Accolades

See also 
List of Gaon Digital Chart number ones of 2016

References

Kim Hee-chul songs
Knowing Bros
2016 singles
2016 songs
SM Entertainment singles
Korean-language songs
Gaon Digital Chart number-one singles
LGBT-related songs